This is a list of the stained glass works of Christopher Whall (1849–1924) in Scotland reflecting Whall's intent to reflect the inspiration of nature in this art.

Whall's works also include:
 Gloucester Cathedral
 War Memorial windows
 Cathedrals and Minsters windows

References

Christopher Whall
Lists of stained glass works